The Battle of Madab was fought in June 1788 in Ethiopia between the forces of Emperor Tekle Giyorgis I, Ras Ali, and Haliu Eshte against the forces Ras Haliu Yosadiq, Wolde Gabriel, and Dejazmach Gebre. Wolde Gabriel was killed in the battle and the allied forces won.

References 

Madab
Battles of the Zemene Mesafint
18th century in Ethiopia
Madab
1788 in Africa
1788 in Ethiopia